Corethrella brakeleyi is a species of frog-biting midge in the family Corethrellidae.

References

Culicoidea
Articles created by Qbugbot
Insects described in 1902